Blanford is a census-designated place in Clinton Township, Vermillion County, in the U.S. state of Indiana.

History
Blanford was laid out in 1912. The community was named for L. S. Blanford, who owned the land where the village is located. A post office has been in operation at Blanford since 1915.

In January 1923, there was an expulsion of the small African American community of the old mining town after an ultimatum was issued at a meeting of over 400 white residents for all African-Americans to leave town or turn over the African-American that had allegedly assaulted an 11 year old girl.  There also was a shootout at a dance hall shortly afterwards where the Sheriff of Vermillion County, Harry Newland, was investigating shots fired at the last two African Americans remaining in town which had killed three white miners who had fired shots at the sheriff.

Geography
Blanford is located at  (39.665060, -87.520580).

Demographics

See also
 Margaret Gisolo

References

Census-designated places in Vermillion County, Indiana
Census-designated places in Indiana
Terre Haute metropolitan area